Steady is the thirteenth studio album by Canadian rock band Sloan.

Recording
Drums for the album were played by Murphy and recorded on a 4-track cassette recorder in 2020 at the Sloan Studio in Toronto. The remainder of the album was recorded at Giant Studio and The Bunker in Toronto, Canada.

Track listing

References

2022 albums
Sloan (band) albums
Yep Roc Records albums
Murderecords albums